Umesh Kasun (born 2 December 1996) is a Sri Lankan cricketer. He made his List A debut for Nuwara Eliya District in the 2016–17 Districts One Day Tournament on 21 March 2017. He made his first-class debut for Moors Sports Club in the 2017–18 Premier League Tournament on 26 January 2018.

References

External links
 

1996 births
Living people
Sri Lankan cricketers
Moors Sports Club cricketers
Nuwara Eliya District cricketers
Cricketers from Colombo